Denise J. Jamieson (born c. 1965) is an American gynecologist. She is the James Robert McCord Chair in Gynecology and Obstetrics at Emory University and former medical officer in the United States Public Health Service.

Early life and education
Jamieson was raised in Livingston, New Jersey, where she graduated from Newark Academy in 1983. She earned her Bachelor of Arts degree from the University of Pennsylvania, her Master's in Public Health from the University of North Carolina at Chapel Hill, and her Medical degree from Duke University School of Medicine.

Career
Upon completing her medical degree, Jamieson became a medical officer in the United States Public Health Service. In 2007, she received a Commissioned Corps Outstanding Service Medal for "outstanding leadership and national and international contributions to women’s health."

Jamieson also joined the Centers for Disease Control and Prevention, where she led a task force to combat the Ebola virus and Zika virus. She also served as an Epidemic Intelligence Service Officer before retiring from the United States Public Health Service in 2017. After spending 20 years with the Centers for Disease Control and Prevention, Jamieson joined the faculty at Emory University as the James Robert McCord Chair in Gynecology and Obstetrics. Later, she was elected a Member of the National Academy of Medicine.

References

External links

Living people
Newark Academy alumni
People from Livingston, New Jersey
Physicians from New Jersey
University of Pennsylvania alumni
University of North Carolina at Chapel Hill alumni
Duke University School of Medicine alumni
Emory University School of Medicine faculty
American gynecologists
Members of the National Academy of Medicine
Year of birth missing (living people)